Fantasio is a fictional character from the Spirou et Fantasio comic strip.

Fantasio may also refer to:
Fantasio (magician)
Fantasio (opera), opera composed by Jacques Offenbach
Fantasio (Smyth), opera composed by Ethel Smyth
Fantasio, play by Alfred de Musset
Fantasio Piccoli (1917–1981), Italian stage director

See also
Fantasia (disambiguation)
Fantasy (disambiguation)
Phantasia (disambiguation)